This is a list of games for the Sony PlayStation Portable handheld console. It does not include PSOne classics or PS minis. Games have been released in several regions around the world; North America (NA), Japan (JP), Europe (EU), and Australia (AUS).  Release dates for other regions are not listed here.

The games show the date the game was first released in that region.

Notes:
 Some games have multiple publishers, varying by region.  In these cases, the publishers are ordered by release date for their respective regions.
 Alternate English titles are listed underneath the main title.

There are currently  games on this list.

Released

Applications

See also 
List of downloadable PlayStation Portable games
List of PlayStation Portable system software compatibilities
List of PlayStation minis

References  

Portable
PlayStation Portable games
PlayStation Portable